is a railway station in the city of Tsuchiura, Ibaraki Prefecture, Japan, operated by East Japan Railway Company (JR East). It is also a freight depot for the Japan Freight Railway Company (JR Freight).

Lines
Tsuchiura Station is served by the Joban Line, and is located 63.8 km from the official starting point of the line at Nippori Station.

Station layout
The station consists of one side platform and one island platform, connected to the station building by a footbridge. The station has a Midori no Madoguchi staffed ticket office.

Platforms

History
Tsuchiura Station opened on 4 November 1895.

The Tsukuba Railway Line operated from this station from 1 April 1987. On 26 October 1943, three trains crashed at Tsuchiura killing 110 people. The station was absorbed into the JR East network upon the privatization of the Japanese National Railways (JNR) on 1 April 1987.

Passenger statistics
In fiscal 2019, the station was used by an average of 15,956 passengers daily (boarding passengers only).

Other transportion

Buses
For Edosaki
For Tsukuba Center
For Tamatsukuri 
For Midorino Station

Port of Tsuchiura

Surrounding area
Tsuchiura City Hall
Tsuchiura Post Office
Port of Tsuchiura
Lake Kasumigaura

See also
 List of railway stations in Japan

References

External links

  

Railway stations in Ibaraki Prefecture
Jōban Line
Railway stations in Japan opened in 1895
Tsuchiura
Stations of Japan Freight Railway Company